The Fukuyama coupling is a coupling reaction taking place between a thioester and an organozinc halide in the presence of a palladium catalyst. The reaction product is a ketone. This reaction was discovered by Tohru Fukuyama et al. in 1998. Advantages are high chemoselectivity, mild reaction conditions and the use of less-toxic reagents.

One advantage of this method is that the reaction stops at the ketone and does not proceed to a tertiary alcohol. In addition, the protocol is compatible with functional groups such as ketones, acetates, sulfides, aromatic bromides, chlorides and aldehydes.

The reaction (interrupted) has been used in the synthesis of biotin

This reaction was preceded by the conceptually related Fukuyama reduction.

References

Carbon-carbon bond forming reactions
Name reactions